The Ibsen Centennial Commemoration Award (Norwegian: Ibsenstatuetten) was awarded by the Government of Norway in commemoration of playwright Henrik Ibsen on the occasion of the 2006 Ibsen Year, the 100th anniversary of Ibsen's death. The prize was awarded to 14 actors and 3 officials of state.

Laureates

Officials of state
Queen Sonja of Norway, the Ibsen Year's high protector
Suzanne Mubarak, First Lady of Egypt, the protector of the International Ibsen Gala Performance in Egypt. The prize was awarded by Queen Sonja.
Jonas Gahr Støre, Foreign Minister of Norway, for the active involvement of the Foreign Ministry in the Ibsen Year. The prize was awarded by Lars Roar Langslet.

Actors
Cate Blanchett, who played the title role in Hedda Gabler in the Sydney Theatre Company's visiting performance at the Brooklyn Academy of Music. The prize was awarded by the Minister of Equality Karita Bekkemellem.
Liv Ullmann
Vanessa Redgrave
Annette Bening
Bibi Andersson
Isabelle Huppert
Glenda Jackson
Shaoli Mitra
Ghita Nørby
Natalja M. Tenjakova
Angela Winkler
Franca Nuti
Wenche Foss
Lise Fjeldstad

See also
International Ibsen Award

References

External links
List of laureates - Norwegian Ministry of Foreign Affairs

Centennial Commemoration Award
Norwegian theatre awards
Awards established in 2006